New Life is a 2016 American romantic drama film directed by Drew Waters and starring Jonathan Patrick Moore, Erin Bethea, James Marsters, Bill Cobbs, Irma P. Hall and Terry O'Quinn. It is Waters' directorial debut.

Cast

Release
The film was released in theaters on October 28, 2016. Then it was released on DVD and digital platforms in March 2017.

Reception
The film has a 29% rating on Rotten Tomatoes. S. Jhoanna Robledo of Common Sense Media awarded the film two stars out of five.

References

External links

2016 directorial debut films
2016 romantic drama films
American romantic drama films
2010s English-language films
2010s American films